Artur Grachyevich Dalaloyan (Russian: Артур Грачьевич Далалоян) born 26 April 1996 is a Russian artistic gymnast who represented ROC at the 2020 Summer Olympics.  He was part of the teams who won gold at the 2020 Olympic Games and 2019 World Championships and silver at the 2018 World Championships. 
Individually Dalaloyan is the 2018 World All-Around Champion and the 2019 World All-Around silver medalist.  He is a nine-time World medalist and a five-time European champion.

Personal life
Dalaloyan was born in Tiraspol, Moldova to an Armenian father and a Russian mother. He has a younger brother. Their parents later moved to Russia. Dalaloyan started doing gymnastics at age six, while still living in Novosibirsk. A year later, his family relocated to Moscow and he began training under Aleksandr Kalinin. Dalaloyan's father left when he was young and is not in contact with him.

While a schoolboy, he performed as a backup dancer for Russia's entrant Alexandra Golovchenko in the Junior Eurovision Song Contest 2007. 

In March 2019 Artur proposed to his partner Olga and they married that year.  Their daughter Nikol was born on 16 August 2019, and their second daughter, Karolina, was born in March 2021. Olga also has a son from a previous relationship.

Career

Junior 
In his junior career, Dalaloyan won bronze in the all-around the 2013 Russian Junior Nationals. He competed at the 2013 Gymnasiade in Brasilia where Russia won the team gold ahead of Great Britain. He won individual medals, taking gold in the rings and vault, silver in the horizontal bar, and bronze in the all-around event.

He appeared in his first major international competition at the 2014 European Junior Championships where the Russian Team won the silver medal, he also qualified in 2 individual apparatus in vault and rings.

Senior

2015–17 
In 2015 and 2016, He competed in the Russian Championships however, Dalaloyan was not selected as an entry list or alternate for the 2016 Rio Olympics. On December 18–22, Dalaloyan won the all-around gold at the Voronin Cup.

In 2017, Dalaloyan had a career breakthrough where he became the 2017 Russian National all-around champion. He then competed in his first major senior event at the 2017 European Championships where he won the all-around silver medal behind Ukraine's Oleg Vernyayev. He qualified in the vault finals where he won the gold medal ahead of Marian Drăgulescu. On August 23–27, Dalaloyan competed at the Russian Cup in Ekaterinburg, he won gold in team, in the all-around after bombing in pommel horse; he slipped into 4th place behind Nikita Ignatyev. In the apparatus finals, Dalaloyan won gold in vault (tied with Nikita Nagornyy) and 2 silver medals on Parallel Bars and Floor Exercise.

2018 
In 2018, Dalaloyan became all-around World Champion. He became the first Russian to achieve that feat since 1999 (when Nikolai Kryukov won in that discipline). He earned 87.598 total points, as did Xiao Ruoteng, though after tie-breaking rules were enforced (which drop the lowest exercise score), Dalaloyan was named All-Around Champion. In event finals, Dalaloyan then won gold on floor exercise, silver on vault, and bronze on parallel bars. He was also awarded the Longines Prize for Elegance.

2019 
At the 2019 European Artistic Gymnastics Championships in Szczecin, Poland, Dalaloyan placed second all-around, first on floor exercise, and third on vault and high bar.

At the 2019 World Artistic Gymnastics Championships, Dalaloyan won with his team, the Russian Federation's first World Championship Team Gold medal, and a silver medal in the Individual All Around competition behind teammate Nikita Nagornyy.

2021 
At the Russian National Championships Dalaloyan placed second behind Aleksandr Kartsev.  He was selected to compete at the upcoming European Championships but had to withdraw to a partial Achilles ligament tear.  In June Dalaloyan was selected to represent the Russian Olympic Committee at the 2020 Summer Olympics alongside Denis Ablyazin, David Belyavskiy, and Nikita Nagornyy.

At the Olympic Games Dalaloyan helped the Russian athletes qualify to the team final in third place and individually he qualified to the all-around final despite his recent injury.  During the team final he competed on all six events and helped the team win gold with a score of 262.5; this was the first team Olympic gold medal for Russian athletes in 25 years.  During the all-around final Dalaloyan finished sixth.

On 11 September, Dalaloyan along with his Olympic Team were awarded with Order of Friendship medals by President Vladimir Putin.

Competitive history

Eponymous skills

Dalaloyan has one skill named after him in the Code of Points (CoP)—a dismount in parallel bars.

References

External links
 
 Artur Dalaloyan at sportgymrus.ru 
 

1996 births
Living people
European champions in gymnastics
Gymnasts at the 2020 Summer Olympics
Gymnasts from Moscow
Medalists at the World Artistic Gymnastics Championships
Medalists at the 2020 Summer Olympics
Moldovan emigrants to Russia
Originators of elements in artistic gymnastics
Olympic gold medalists for the Russian Olympic Committee athletes
Olympic gold medalists for Russia
Olympic gymnasts of Russia
Olympic medalists in gymnastics
Russian male artistic gymnasts
Russian sportspeople of Armenian descent
Russian people of Armenian descent
Russian people of Moldovan descent
World champion gymnasts